Isfahan and Suburbs Bus Company is a public transport agency running Transit buses in Isfahan city and surrounding satellite cities and settlements in the Greater Isfahan Region, Central Iran. The municipalities served other than Isfahan are: Abrisham, Baharestan, Dastgerd, Dolatabad, Dorcheh, Gaz, Habibabad, Khomeynishahr, Komeshcheh, and Qahjavarestan.
The organization was founded on October 26, 1967 with an initial capital of 39'100'000 Rials (Equivalent to 54'768'540'300 Rials in 2013, 1'738'680 US Dollars in 2013, 245'453 US Dollars in 1967)

Fleet
Buses used are mostly manufactured by Iran Khodro Diesel. The oldest model active in the fleet is IKD O457 City Bus. These buses were later upgraded to be able to use CNG fuel, becoming the model IKD CNG City Bus O457G-OSG. Esfahan also utilizes Shahab Khodro Renault Eurobuses. Also the higher capacity MEGATRANS City Bus is also used in the fleet. Recent buses entering the fleet are Oghab Scania-3112 models.

Buses utilized in BRT lines, are 2 cabins, and are SNA X-MOB 18001 and XMQ6180G1 models.

Smart Card

The first time a smart card system was used on Isfahan buses was in summer 2010, with studies done over the summer and the contractor chosen over the fall of 2009. The system was reorganized with the creation of ESCard in summer 2012.

Routes

BRT

BRT's ridership at summer of 2015 is 120'000 per day.

Formerly
Before September 15, 2014, There were two BRT bus routes. On that date, these routes were merged to create one continuous route.

Normal Routes

Night Routes
These routes are active from 20:30 to 23:00 daily. Currently there are 15 active night routes, plus the BRT route

References

Bus transport in Iran
Transport in Isfahan
Transportation in Isfahan Province